The George Washington University School of Nursing (abbreviated as GW Nursing or GWSON) is the professional nursing school of the George Washington University, in Washington, D.C. Founded in 2010, GW Nursing is the newest of the 10 schools and colleges of George Washington University.

U.S. News & World Report University Rankings ranks GW Nursing as the 30th best doctoral the 27th best masters programs in nursing in the United States.

History
The GW School of Nursing was established as the university's tenth academic institution in 2010, although the first nursing education at GW started in 1903.

Facilities 
The School of Nursing is located at both the Foggy Bottom Campus and  theVirginia Science & Technology Campus (VSTC) in Ashburn, Virginia.

At the VSTC campus, GW Nursing offers students the access to the Simulation Learning and Innovation Center, including three clinical simulations spaces, covering more than 10,000 square feet, which are used for medical training.

Organization and administration 
The school's Founding Dean was Jean Johnson, who was succeeded by the School of Nursing's current dean Pamela R. Jeffries. In 2016, Jeffries was awarded the Mary Adelaide Nutting Award for Outstanding Leadership in Nursing Education by the National League for Nursing (NLN).

GW Nursing cooperates with different local, national and international partners,  e.g. offering a Nursing Scholar Program at GW Hospital, medical mission trips to Haiti or local health education projects in Korea.

Academics

The School of Nursing currently has over 60 faculty members. There are around 800 students enrolled in the School of Nursing. The school offers guaranteed admission to Montgomery College and Virginia Community College System students.

The school provides education at the bachelor's, master's, and doctorate level and also offers additional post-master's certificates. All graduate programs are online. The degrees are accredited by the Commission of Collegiate Nursing Education (CCNE), the Virginia Board of Nursing and the Washington, D.C., Board of Nursing.

In 2017, GW Nursing launched a wellness and student support program to help students cope with and balance the harmful effects of stress experienced in academic, personal and clinical settings during their time at GWSON.

Rankings 
The George Washington University School of Nursing was ranked #27 in Best Nursing Schools: Master's and #30 in Best Nursing Schools: Doctor of Nursing Practice by U.S. News in 2022.

Research 
In 2018, GWSON launched a "students-first" program, to raise its research profile, integrating student feedback, strategic outlines and goals, launching a research award and implementing a new policy task force to improve administrative policies, fostering research excellence.

The school is home to different research centers and initiatives:

 The Center for Health Policy and Media Engagement 
 The Center for Global and Community Initiatives
 The Center for Aging, Health and Humanities
 The Health Workforce Institute

References

External links
 Official site
Full list of GW Nursing's partnering institutions

 
Colleges and Schools of The George Washington University
Educational institutions established in 2010
2010 establishments in Washington, D.C.